Easton Farm Meadow is a  biological Site of Special Scientific Interest  in Easton, west of Boxford in Berkshire. It is in the North Wessex Downs.

The site is  lowland neutral grassland In the past the meadows around Easton Farm were managed traditionally as 'floated' water meadows.

Fauna

The site has the following animals

Birds

Snipe

Invertebrates

Silis ruficollis
Zicrona caerulea
Subcoccinella vigintiquatuorpunctata
Nemotelus pantherinus

Flora

The site has the following Flora:

Caltha palustris
Eleocharis palustris
Filipendula ulmaria
Angelica sylvestris
Cirsium palustre
Galium uliginosum
Lychnis flos-cuculi
Holcus lanatus
Valeriana dioica
Carex panicea
Carex nigra
Iris pseudacorus
Rumex hydrolapathum
Carex acutiformis
Carex paniculata
Dactylorhiza praetermissa
Dactylorhiza incarnata
Blysmus compressus

References

Sites of Special Scientific Interest in Berkshire
Welford, Berkshire